Mitannia is a genus of bristle flies in the family Tachinidae. There is at least one described species in Mitannia, M. insueta.

Distribution
Turkey.

References

Dexiinae
Diptera of Asia
Tachinidae genera